Corinth, Alabama may refer to the following places in Alabama:
Corinth, Bullock County, Alabama
Corinth, Clay County, Alabama
Corinth, Cullman County, Alabama
Corinth (north), Randolph County, Alabama
Corinth (south), Randolph County, Alabama
Corinth, Walker County, Alabama
Corinth, Winston County, Alabama
Plantersville, Alabama, formerly known as Corinth